Upplands-Folket was a communist weekly newspaper published in Uppsala, Sweden from March 1945 to December 1949. It had a weekly edition of around 3998 in 1946, 3800 in 1947 and 2900 in 1949.

Upplandsfolket was released as a public magazine in 2001, by its owner Left party in Uppsala county. The pdf-version could be read at  Go to the meny "Artikelarkiv" on that side choose "Upplandsfolket arkiv" and "Visa". Its edition is a meagre 300 to 500 copies in print. Before going public again the papers name was used for an internal newsbulletin for members of the Leftparty.

References

1945 establishments in Sweden
1949 disestablishments in Sweden
Newspapers established in 1945
Publications disestablished in 1949
Defunct newspapers published in Sweden
Communist newspapers published in Sweden
Defunct weekly newspapers
Swedish-language newspapers
Mass media in Uppsala
Weekly newspapers published in Sweden